The 1975 World Netball Championships was the fourth edition of the INF Netball World Cup, a quadrennial premier event in international netball. It took place from 22 August to 4 September and was held in Auckland, New Zealand. It featured 11 teams with the debut of (Fiji and Papua New Guinea).

After each team had played ten games, Australia successfully defended its 1969 title with nine wins and a draw (against New Zealand). England took the silver medal and New Zealand took the bronze medal.

Results

Table

Round 1

Round 2

Round 3

Round 4

Round 5

Round 6

Round 7

Round 8

Round 9

Round 10

Round 11

Medallists

References

Netball World Cup
1975 in netball
1975 in New Zealand sport
World
Sports competitions in Auckland
1970s in Auckland
August 1975 sports events in New Zealand
September 1975 sports events in New Zealand